The La Paz Department of Bolivia comprises  with a 2012 census population of 2,706,359 inhabitants. It is situated at the western border of Bolivia, sharing Lake Titicaca with adjacent  Peru. Northeast of the Cordillera Real are the Yungas, the steep eastern slopes of the Andes Mountains that make the transition to the Amazon River basin to the northeast. The capital of the department is the city of La Paz and is the administrative city and seat of government/national capital of Bolivia.

Provinces 

The Department of La Paz is divided into 20 provinces (provincias) which are further subdivided into 85 municipalities (municipios) and - on the fourth level - into cantons.

The provinces with their capitals are:

Government
The chief executive office of Bolivia's departments (since May 2010) is the Governor; before then, the office was called the Prefect, and until 2006 the prefect was appointed by the President of Bolivia and then the governor is elected by the voters. The current governor, Santos Quispe, was elected on 11 April 2021 and took office on 3 May.

Under the 2009 Constitution, Bolivian departments have an elected legislature, known as the Departmental Legislative Assembly. The La Paz Assembly has 45 members including five indigenous / natives minority representatives.

The most recent governor election results (2021) are as follows:

Past executives

Demographics

Languages 
The languages spoken in the department are mainly Spanish, Aymara, Quechua and Guaraní. The following table shows the number of people belonging to the recognized group of speakers.

Places of interest 
 Apolobamba Integrated Management Natural Area
 Cotapata National Park and Integrated Management Natural Area
 Pilón Lajas Biosphere Reserve and Communal Lands
 Lake Titicaca
 Chacaltaya

Towns and villages 
 

Arapata
Belén, Aroma
Khasani
La Chojlla
Machacamarca, Aroma
Marquirivi
Palcoco
Pasto Pata
Puerto Guaqui

References

External links 

 La Paz City Guide
 Weather in La Paz
 Bolivian Music and Web Varieties
 Full information of La Paz Department

 
Departments of Bolivia